WFMO (860 AM) is a radio station broadcasting an Urban Gospel format. Licensed to Fairmont, North Carolina, United States, the station is currently owned by Stuart Epperson, Jr., through licensee Truth Broadcasting Corporation.

History
Jim Clark's Pro-Media Inc. owned WFMO and WSTS when WFMO became part of the "WE-DO" black gospel and news and information network started by Wes Cookman's WIDU in Fayetteville, along with WAGR and WEWO.

WFMO and WSTS were sold by Davidson Media Group to Truth Broadcasting effective April 14, 2015, at a price of $475,000. 

Effective April 12, 2017, WFMO airs similar programming to sister stations WPOL and WKEW  which consists of Erica Campbell, Willie Moore Jr, as well as other urban gospel programming.

References

External links

Gospel radio stations in the United States
FMO